was a Japanese football player. He played for the Japanese national team.

National team career
In August 1927, when Asakura was a Waseda University student, he was selected Japan national team for 1927 Far Eastern Championship Games in Shanghai. At this competition, on August 27, he debuted against Republic of China. On August 29, he also played against Philippines and Japan won this match. This is Japan national team first victory in International A Match. He played 2 games for Japan in 1927.

National team statistics

References

External links
 
 Japan National Football Team Database

Year of birth missing
Year of death missing
Waseda University alumni
Japanese footballers
Japan international footballers
Association football midfielders